The title of Earl of Devonshire has been created twice in the Peerage of England, firstly in 1603 for the Blount family and then recreated in 1618 for the Cavendish family, in whose possession the earldom remains.

It is not to be confused with, and is separate from, the more ancient title of Earl of Devon which belongs to the Courtenay family.

List of Earls of Devonshire

Earls of Devonshire, first creation (1603) 

 
 Charles Blount, 1st Earl of Devonshire (1563–1606)

Earls of Devonshire, second creation (1618) 

 William Cavendish, 1st Earl of Devonshire (1552–1626)
 William Cavendish, 2nd Earl of Devonshire (1591–1628)
 William Cavendish, 3rd Earl of Devonshire (1617–1684)
 William Cavendish, 1st Duke of Devonshire, 4th Earl of Devonshire (1640–1707)
 William Cavendish, 2nd Duke of Devonshire, 5th Earl of Devonshire (1673–1729)
 William Cavendish, 3rd Duke of Devonshire, 6th Earl of Devonshire (1698–1755)
 William Cavendish, 4th Duke of Devonshire, 7th Earl of Devonshire (1720–1764)
 William Cavendish, 5th Duke of Devonshire, 8th Earl of Devonshire (1748–1811)
 William Cavendish, 6th Duke of Devonshire, 9th Earl of Devonshire (1790–1858)
 William Cavendish, 7th Duke of Devonshire, 10th Earl of Devonshire (1808–1891)
 Spencer Cavendish, 8th Duke of Devonshire, 11th Earl of Devonshire (1833–1908)
 Victor Cavendish, 9th Duke of Devonshire, 12th Earl of Devonshire (1868–1938)
 Edward Cavendish, 10th Duke of Devonshire, 13th Earl of Devonshire (1895–1950)
 Andrew Cavendish, 11th Duke of Devonshire, 14th Earl of Devonshire (1920–2004)
 Peregrine Cavendish, 12th Duke of Devonshire, 15th Earl of Devonshire (b. 1944)

The heir apparent is the oldest son of the current holder, William Cavendish, Earl of Burlington (b. 1969).

Family tree

See also
 Duke of Devonshire

References

External links
 Burke's Peerage & Baronetage

1603 establishments in England
1618 establishments in England
Blount family
Cavendish family
Earldoms in the Peerage of England
Noble titles created in 1603
Noble titles created in 1618